The Acolyte is a Miles Franklin Award-winning novel by Australian author Thea Astley first published in 1972.

Plot summary 

The novel is told in the first person by “the acolyte,” Paul Vesper. The novel traces the career of a fictional Australian musician and composer named Jack Holberg. Beginning in obscurity as a piano player in Grogbusters, a dreary little Queensland town, the blind Holberg eventually gains international recognition as a composer. Vesper, who had met Holberg during his less renowned period, gives up an engineering career to serve the great man—in a sense, to become his eyes.

Notes 

In an interview noted in The Canberra Times, Astley stated that she wrote the book partly in answer to Patrick White's The Vivisector. ""Why write only about the great, changing Christ figures?" she asked a Sydney journalist. "Why not write about the other people who share their lives?""

Critical reception 

After the novel had been republished in the US in 1988 Kirkus Reviews wasn't overly impressed: "In The Acolyte (1972), a failed engineer and two German sisters devote themselves, body and soul, to the whims of an egotistical blind composer. The author uses great care in dissecting the minutest variations in their orgies of self-sacrifice, but she neglects to show what it is that draws them to destruction. All three are willing doormats from the start. As a result, there is a good deal of truth in Astley's observations but very little interest. Nor are matters helped any by an ostentatiously prickly style."

Writing in an overview of Astley's work in 2010 Megha Trivedi stated: "The novel carries human element of love, the frustration of Paul Vesper and his brutal reaction against the selfishness of Holberg.  The Acolyte highlights the never ending personal, spiritual and artistic desires of human beings."

References

 Middlemiss.org

Novels by Thea Astley
1972 Australian novels
Miles Franklin Award-winning works
Angus & Robertson books